Albert Henry Mills (8 February 1889 – 4 September 1972) was an English football outside left who played in the Football League for Charlton Athletic.

Personal life 
Mills was a cable maker by profession. He served in the British Army during the First World War and was seriously wounded.

Career statistics

References

English footballers
Croydon Common F.C. players
Charlton Athletic F.C. players
Southern Football League players
English Football League players
British Army personnel of World War I
1889 births
1972 deaths
Footballers from Charlton, London
Association football outside forwards
Tunbridge Wells F.C. players